Elachistites is an extinct genus of moth in the family Elachistidae. It contains several species described from Baltic amber.

References

Fossil Lepidoptera
Fossil taxa described in 1987
†
Prehistoric insects of Europe